Kehä III ("ring three", National road 50; or  or ;  or ) is an important highway in Southern Finland. It is the outermost of the three beltways in the Helsinki region, and the first one to be built. It lies across the four Finnish municipalities of Kirkkonummi, Espoo, Vantaa and Helsinki.

Overview
Work on Kehä III started in 1962, on the base of an existing road. The construction was finished in 1972, initially with only one lane per direction.  Most parts of the road have since been expanded to at least two lanes per direction, although the westernmost end is still one-lane per direction in places.

The most recent construction work has been extensive renovation on its busiest stretch in Vantaa, where several interchanges have been built or improved, and lanes added. Industrial development along the road has introduced higher volumes of heavy traffic.

The European route E18 is routed through Kehä III, bypassing central Helsinki.

Kehä III is often informally or jokingly considered the outer border of the Helsinki area, because most of the urban development of the capital region is inside the ring. The road itself doesn't follow any legal border and rural and urban landscapes can be found on both sides of it.

The new zone system for fares in the HSL area mostly follows the borders of Kehä III.

History

The beginning was constructed between 1962 and 1965 from Bemböle to Länsisalmi and the continuation to Jorvas was completed in 1968. Originally, each road was two lanes wide. The amount of traffic grew considerably over time and as a result the original intersections with Helsinki's exit roads became dangerous. Therefore, all intersections with the city exits had been rebuilt as merging loops by the beginning of the 1970s. The road has undergone almost continual modification and widening throughout its existence as traffic has increased in the region.

In the mid-1970s, the road between Tikkurila and Helsinki-Vantaa Airport was renovated and 10 years later the road was expanded to four lanes up to Vihdintie. At the end of the 1980s, the road was extended to Muurala and then once again one kilometer farther to the west. This same stretch was rebuilt shortly afterwards when it was expanded to four lanes up through Gumböle during the 1990s. Throughout the 1980s, stretches of Kehä III were completed to the Lahti motorway and in the 1990s to the Porvoo motorway. The road to Vuosaari Harbour, completed in 2007, extends from the eastern endpoint of Kehä III. At the start of 2000s major improvements were made to the heavily used stretch from Tikkurila to Helsinki-Vantaa Airport: the road was widened to 6 lanes and Tuusulanväylä motorway's intersection was rebuilt as a large system connection.

When the road was originally built, it was simply called the "Ring road", but the planning of the other two major roads caused confusion. Therefore, it was called Kehä III from the 1970s onward.

See also
Kehä I
Kehä II
Vihdintie
Tuusulanväylä

External links

Ring roads in Finland
Roads in Finland
Streets in Helsinki
Transport in Helsinki
Transport in Espoo
Transport in Vantaa